Cecilia Smith may refer to:
 Cecilia Smith (activist), Australian Aboriginal activist
 Cecilia Smith (rugby union), Australian rugby union player
 Cecile de Wentworth, née Cecilia Smith, American portrait artist